"Double Vision" is a song by 3OH!3 from their album Streets of Gold. The song, which was released as the third promo single as part of the "Countdown to Streets of Gold", also doubles as the album's official second single. The song has been added to Radio 1's B Playlist in the United Kingdom. The official remix features rapper Wiz Khalifa.  A Simlish version of this song is also featured on the soundtrack for The Sims 3: Late Night video game expansion pack.

Critical reception
David Jeffries of AllMusic praised the song as one of the album's "big, vibrant, well-crafted productions", commenting that both "Double Vision" and "Déjà Vu" "might as well be Katy Perry singles".

Chart performance
In the United States, "Double Vision" debuted at number 89 on the Billboard Hot 100 chart for the issue dated July 3, 2010. The song re-entered the chart for the issue dated November 6, 2010, spending a total of four nonconsecutive weeks on the chart. The song also became a top 40 hit on the Mainstream Top 40 chart, peaking at number 37.

In Canada, the song peaked at number 49 on the Canadian Hot 100 on July 3, 2010. On July 11, 2010, "Double Vision" peaked at number 42 on the Australian ARIA Singles Chart.

Music video
The music video was directed by Evan Bernard. The video was released at noon GMT in UK and was available worldwide at noon EST on 20 August. The video resembles browsing through a page on the Internet, with various people (including the 3OH!3 duo) performing actions on a static background picture to mimic short video clips or advertisements as the "page" periodically scrolls down.

Track listings and formats
Digital download
"Double Vision"  – 3:10
"Double Vision" (Sidney Samson Remix) – 5:23
"Double Vision" (Video) 

Digital download (Remix)
"Double Vision" featuring Wiz Khalifa – 3:34

Credits and personnel
Sean Foreman – producer, writer, lead vocals
Nathaniel Motte – producer, writer, lead vocals, drums, keyboards, programming
Benny Blanco – producer, writer, background vocals, drums, keyboards, programming
Matt Squire – producer, writer, drums, keyboards, programming, guitars, engineering, vocal editing
Steve Tippeconnic – tambourine, engineering assistant
Larry Goetz – engineering assistant
Jeremy "J Boogs" Levin – vocal editing assistant
Jimmy James – production assistant
Serban Ghenea – mixing at MixStar Studios (Virginia Beach)
John Hanes – engineered for mix
Tim Roberts – assistant engineered for mix

Credits and personnel adapted from "Double Vision" CD single liner notes.

Charts

References

2010 singles
2010 songs
3OH!3 songs
Song recordings produced by Benny Blanco
Songs written by Benny Blanco
Songs written by Nathaniel Motte
Songs written by Matt Squire
Songs written by Sean Foreman
Photo Finish Records singles